Portington is a hamlet in the East Riding of Yorkshire, England.

It forms part of the civil parish of Eastrington. Portington lies within the Parliamentary constituency of Haltemprice and Howden an area that mainly consists of middle class suburbs, towns and villages. The area is affluent and has one of the highest proportions of owner-occupiers in the country.

Portington Hall is a Grade II listed building.

References

External links

Villages in the East Riding of Yorkshire